Haden Branch Railway was a branch railway line from Kingsthorpe to Goombungee and Haden in the Darling Downs, Queensland, Australia.

Kingsthorpe is about twenty kilometres from Toowoomba on the Western railway line.  The Queensland Parliament approved a  branch line north to Goombungee and Haden in December 1908.

First used on 21 December 1910, but officially opened in January 1911, the line terminated at Wahoon which was later renamed Haden after the maiden name of the railway minister's wife. Between Goombungee and Haden, sidings were established at Weelu and Neuve.  A thrice weekly mixed service was replaced in 1930 by a daily rail motor and a twice weekly goods train.

The branch closed from 1 May 1964 due no doubt to economic reasons.

References

External links
 1925 map of the Queensland railway system

Closed railway lines in Queensland
Railway lines opened in 1910
Railway lines closed in 1964
Darling Downs
3 ft 6 in gauge railways in Australia
1910 establishments in Australia
1964 disestablishments in Australia